Guillermo Mena Palmer (born May 9, 1994, in Mexico City) is a Mexican professional footballer who last played for Pumas UNAM Premier. He made his professional debut with Pumas UNAM during a Copa MX draw against Puebla on 27 February 2013.

External links
 

Living people
1994 births
Mexican footballers
Club Universidad Nacional footballers
Liga Premier de México players
Footballers from Mexico City
Association footballers not categorized by position